The Estonian Cup was the national ice hockey cup competition in Estonia. It was held in 1996, 1997, 1998, and 2007. Tartu Välk 494 won the most cups, with two.

Champions

References

National ice hockey cup competitions in Europe
Ice hockey competitions in Estonia